Virginia True Boardman (born Margaret Shields, May 23, 1889 – June 10, 1971) was an American actress of the silent era.

Biography
Born in Fort Davis, Texas, Boardman began her theatrical career in 1906 as Virginia Eames (using her mother's surname) and acted with the Streeter-Bryan company in 1908. 

She went on to appear in 52 films between 1911 and 1936. Although her career started off strong, like many actresses of the silent film era she failed to make a successful transition to talking films, and by the mid-1930s her career was at its end for all practical purposes.

On January 16, 1909, she married actor True Boardman, and they remained wed until his death in 1918. The couple performed together in stock theater companies and in vaudeville. They had one child, True Eames Boardman, who after a brief acting career had a long career as a script writer for radio, film and television. He was also the grandfather of actress Lisa Gerritsen.

She died in Hollywood, California, aged 82, from a heart attack.

Partial filmography

 The Light of Western Stars (1918)
 The Railroader (1919)
 The Village Blacksmith (1922)
 A Blind Bargain (1922)
 The Third Alarm (1922)
 Michael O'Halloran (1923)
 Three Jumps Ahead (1923)
 Pioneer Trails (1923)
 The Barefoot Boy (1923)
 The Gunfighter (1923)
 The Tomboy (1924)
 The Test of Donald Norton (1926)
 King of the Jungle (1927)
 Down the Stretch (1927)
 Speedy Smith (1927)
 The Lady Lies (1929)
 Scareheads (1931)
 The Penal Code (1932)
 Sister to Judas (1932)
 The Big Chance (1933)
 Pardon My Pups (1934)
 The Road to Ruin (1934)
 The Crime Patrol (1936)
 Brand of the Outlaws (1936)
 The Fugitive Sheriff (1936)

References

External links

1889 births
1971 deaths
Actresses from Texas
American silent film actresses
20th-century American actresses
Vaudeville performers
American stage actresses